Holly Janet Stewart (born 18 May 1993) is a Canadian women's field hockey player.

Playing career

Senior National Team
Stewart first represented Canada in 2013, in a test match against Ireland. Stewart's first major tournament in the Canada team was the 2014 Commonwealth Games in Glasgow, Scotland. The team finished eighth in the tournament.

In 2015, Stewart represented Canada at the 2015 Pan American Games, where the team finished third, winning the bronze medal. She was also a member of the team at the 2019 Pan American Games where they won a silver medal.

Junior National Team
Stewart first represented the junior national team in 2012, at the Junior Pan American Cup. The team won silver at the tournament, and qualified for the 2013 Junior World Cip, where Stewart also played.

References

External links
 
 
 Holly Janet Stewart at the Lima 2019 Pan American Games

1993 births
Living people
Canadian female field hockey players
Sportspeople from British Columbia
Commonwealth Games competitors for Canada
Field hockey players at the 2014 Commonwealth Games
Pan American Games medalists in field hockey
Field hockey players at the 2015 Pan American Games
Pan American Games bronze medalists for Canada
Pan American Games silver medalists for Canada
Field hockey players at the 2019 Pan American Games
Medalists at the 2015 Pan American Games
Medalists at the 2019 Pan American Games